Charles Casey White (born June 10, 1976) is an American-trained chef and author.

He was one of the co-authors of Sheryl Crow's cookbook, If it makes you healthy, along with Mary Goodbody and Victoria Pearson.

References

1976 births
Living people
American chefs
American male chefs
American food writers